The Bank Messenger Mystery is a 1936 British crime film directed by Lawrence Huntington and starring George Mozart, Francesca Bahrle and Paul Neville. It was an early production of Hammer Films. It follows a bank cashier who, feeling he has been wrongly fired, teams up with criminals to rob the bank.

Cast
 George Mozart as George Brown 
 Francesca Bahrle as Miss Brown  
 Paul Neville as Harper  
 Marilyn Love 
 Frank Tickle
 Kenneth Kove

References

Bibliography
Chibnall, Steve. Quota Quickies: The Birth of the British 'B' Film. British Film Institute, 2007.
Low, Rachael. Filmmaking in 1930s Britain. George Allen & Unwin, 1985.
Wood, Linda. British Films, 1927–1939. British Film Institute, 1986.

External links

1936 films
British crime films
British black-and-white films
1936 crime films
Films directed by Lawrence Huntington
British heist films
Hammer Film Productions films
1930s English-language films
1930s British films